William Berezowski (January 31, 1928 – October 23, 2015), also known as William Barclay, was a Canadian football player who played for the Hamilton Tiger-Cats and Toronto Argonauts. He won the Grey Cup with Hamilton in 1953.

References

1928 births
2015 deaths
Hamilton Tiger-Cats players
McMaster Marauders football players
Players of Canadian football from Quebec
Sportspeople from Rouyn-Noranda